The 1956 South Carolina United States Senate election was held on November 6, 1956 to select the U.S. Senator from the state of South Carolina simultaneously with the special Senate election. Incumbent Democratic Senator Olin D. Johnston handily defeated Republican mayor of Clemson Leon P. Crawford.

Democratic primary
Olin D. Johnston, the incumbent Senator, faced no opposition from South Carolina Democrats and avoided a primary election.

Republican primary
Leon P. Crawford, the mayor of the town of Clemson in the Upstate, faced no opposition from South Carolina Republicans and avoided a primary election.

General election campaign
Crawford campaigned as a defender of states' rights and denounced Johnston for backing the New Deal and the Fair Deal.  The state Republican Party believed that Crawford could have a chance in the election if he galvanized the 128,000 registered black voters, although they were weary of being labeled as the black party.  In the end, Johnston remained highly popular with the voters who were still leery of the Republican party and he easily defeated Crawford in the general election.

Election results

 
 

|-
| 
| colspan=5 |Democratic hold
|-

See also
List of United States senators from South Carolina
1956 United States Senate elections
1956 United States Senate special election in South Carolina

References
"Supplemental Report of the Secretary of State to the General Assembly of South Carolina." Reports and Resolutions of South Carolina to the General Assembly of the State of South Carolina. Volume I. Columbia, SC: 1957, pp. 8–9.

South C
1956
1956 South Carolina elections